Naltriben is a potent and selective antagonist for the delta opioid receptor, which is used in scientific research. It has similar effects to the more widely used δ antagonist naltrindole, but with different binding affinity for the δ1 and δ2 subtypes, which makes it useful for distinguishing the subtype selectivity of drugs acting at the δ receptors. It also acts as a κ-opioid agonist at high doses.

See also 
 Nalfurafine
 Nalmefene
 Naltrindole

References 

Delta-opioid receptor antagonists
Dibenzofurans
4,5-Epoxymorphinans
Phenols
Tertiary alcohols
Kappa-opioid receptor agonists
Semisynthetic opioids